KidZone TV is an Estonian children's TV channel. It is broadcast in 3 countries and 4 languages, although programs are not dubbed into the languages; rather, they are aired in either English or their original languages with voiceover translators speaking over the programs to translate all dialogue into the target language. It was launched on 13 June 2014 at 3:00 pm.

On June 28, 2018, KidZone TV changed its logo and branding, and got a new set of idents.

In 2020, KidZone TV was rebranded once again, and opened its own internet store.

KidZone has a sister channel that was formerly knows as KidZone+, but rebranded as Kidzone Mini in 2021. The channel airs programs targeted at a younger audience than the main KidZone channel. However, KidZone does show some of KidZone Mini's programs, such as Peppa Pig and Thomas & Friends, as well.                                            

On 1 December, 2022, KidZone TV along side KidZone Mini, The russian audio was removed (Only Estonia). Instead, the Russian content is moved to Semejka.

References

External links

Television channels in Estonia
Television channels in Latvia
Television channels in Lithuania